Lena is a rural locality (a selo) in Kozminskoye Rural Settlement of Lensky District, Arkhangelsk Oblast, Russia. The population was 372 as of 2010. There are 5 streets.

Geography 
Lena is located 34 km southwest of Yarensk (the district's administrative centre) by road. Shubinskaya is the nearest rural locality.

References 

Rural localities in Lensky District, Arkhangelsk Oblast